Lehi may refer to:

Places 
 Lehi (Bible), a location in Judea
 Lehi, Arizona, a community
 Lehi, Arkansas, a community
 Lehi, Utah, a city
 Lehi (UTA station), for commuter rail

Other 
 Lehi (militant group), Zionist paramilitary organization in British Mandate of Palestine

People in Book of Mormon 
 Prophets:
 Lehi (Book of Mormon prophet), 7th–6th cen. BC
 Lehi, son of Helaman, late 1st cen. BC
 Lehi (commander), Nephite military commander; see 
 Lehi (son of Zoram), see

See also
 Lahi (disambiguation)